Arctorthezia is a genus of true bugs belonging to the family Ortheziidae.

The genus was first described by Cockerell in 1902.

The species of this genus are found in Europe and Northern America.

Species include:
 Arctorthezia cataphracta (Olafsen, 1772)

References

Ortheziidae